A civil flag is a version of the national flag that is flown by civilians on nongovernmental installations or craft. The use of civil flags was more common in the past to denote buildings or ships not crewed by the military.

In some countries, the civil flag is the same as the state flag but without the coat of arms, such as in the case of flags from Peru, Serbia and Spain. In others, it is an alteration of the war flag.

In Scandinavia, state and war flags can be double and triple-tailed variants of the Nordic Cross flag. Many countries, particularly those with a British heritage, still have distinctive civil flags (technically civil ensigns) for use at sea, many based on the Red Ensign.

References

Further reading

 

Types of flags